Boba may refer to: 

Boba, Hungary, a village in Vas county, Hungary
Tapioca balls, or boba, a starchy food
Boba tea, or bubble tea, a Taiwanese drink

See also
Boba Fett (disambiguation)